Atrium may refer to:

Anatomy 
 Atrium (heart), an anatomical structure of the heart
 Atrium, the genital structure next to the genital aperture in the reproductive system of gastropods
 Atrium of the ventricular system of the brain
 Pulmonary alveolus (also known as atrium alveolus), microscopic air sac in the lungs

Buildings 
 Atrium (architecture), an open space within a building, either open to the sky or featuring a glass roof
 Amot Atrium Tower, a tower in Ramat Gan, Israel
 Atrium, Cardiff, a University of South Wales building in Cardiff
 Atrium Building, a skyscraper in Guatemala City
 Atrium Casino, a casino in Dax, France
 Atrium Cinemas, a movie theatre in Karachi, Pakistan
 Winter Garden Atrium, a Brookfield Properties building in the World Financial Center of the World Trade Center, New York City
 Atrium on Bay, a retail and office complex in Toronto, Canada

Companies 
 Atrium Health, based in Charlotte, North Carolina

See also
 The Atrium (disambiguation)